Glutamicibacter soli is a species of gram-positive bacteria.

References

Further reading
Whitman, William B., et al., eds. Bergey's manual® of systematic bacteriology. Vol. 5. Springer, 2012. 

Eschbach, Martin, et al. "Members of the genus Arthrobacter grow anaerobically using nitrate ammonification and fermentative processes: anaerobic adaptation of aerobic bacteria abundant in soil." FEMS Microbiology Letters 223.2 (2003): 227–230.

External links

LPSN
Type strain of Arthrobacter soli at BacDive -  the Bacterial Diversity Metadatabase

Micrococcaceae
Psychrophiles